Mink are dark-colored, semiaquatic, carnivorous mammals of the genera Neogale and Mustela and part of the family Mustelidae, which also includes weasels, otters, and ferrets. There are two extant species referred to as "mink": the American mink and the European mink. The extinct sea mink was related to the American mink but was much larger.

The American mink's fur has been highly prized for use in clothing. Their treatment on fur farms has been a focus of animal rights and animal welfare activism. American mink have established populations in Europe (including Great Britain and Denmark) and South America. Some people believe this happened after the animals were released from mink farms by animal rights activists, or otherwise escaped from captivity. In the UK, under the Wildlife and Countryside Act 1981, it is illegal to release mink into the wild. In some countries, any live mink caught in traps must be humanely killed.

American mink are believed by some to have contributed to the decline of the less hardy European mink through competition (though not through hybridization—native European mink are in fact more closely related to polecats than to North American mink). Trapping is used to control or eliminate introduced American mink populations.

Mink oil is used in some medical products and cosmetics, as well as to treat, preserve, and waterproof leather.

Species
The American mink (Neogale vison) is larger and more adaptable than the European mink (Mustela lutreola)  but, due to variations in size, an individual mink usually cannot be determined as European or American with certainty without looking at the skeleton. However, all European mink have a large white patch on their upper lip, whereas only some American mink have this marking. Therefore, any mink without the patch is certainly of the American species. Taxonomically, both American and European mink were placed in the same genus Mustela but the American mink was reclassified as belonging to its own genus, Neovison, though it has recently been reclassified alongside several other weasels into the genus Neogale.

The sea mink (Neogale macrodon), native to the New England area, is considered to be a close relative of the American mink. Its extinction in the late 19th century, was chiefly result of hunting for the fur trade.

Description
Farm-bred males can reach .

A mink's rich glossy coat in its wild state is brown and looks silky. Farm-bred mink can vary from white to almost black, which is reflected in the British wild mink. Their pelage is deep, rich brown, with or without white spots on the underparts, and consists of a slick, dense underfur overlaid with dark, glossy, almost stiff guard hairs.

Mink show the curious phenomenon of delayed implantation. Although the true gestation period is 39 days, the embryo may stop developing for a variable period, so that as long as 76 days may elapse before the litter arrives. Between 45 and 52 days is normal. There is only one litter per year. They typically have between six and 10 kits per litter. Litters as large as 16 have been recorded at fur farms.

The maximum lifespan of a mink is usually around ten years, but rarely exceeds three years in the wild.

Diet

Mink prey on fish and other aquatic life, small mammals, birds, and eggs; adults may eat young mink. Mink raised on farms primarily eat expired cheese, eggs, fish, meat and poultry slaughterhouse byproducts, dog food, and turkey livers, as well as prepared commercial foods. A farm with 3,000 mink may use as much as two tons of food per day.

Habitats

Mink like to live near water and are seldom found far from riverbanks, lakes, and marshes. Even when roaming, they tend to follow streams and ditches. Sometimes they leave the water altogether for a few hundred meters, especially when looking for rabbits, one of their favorite foods. In some places, particularly in Scotland and in Iceland, they live along the seashore. Sometimes they live in towns if suitable water is available. Mink may be present at all hours, even when people are nearby.

Territory
Mink are very territorial animals. A male mink will not tolerate another male within his territory but appears to be less aggressive towards females. Generally, the territories of both male and female animals are separate, but a female's territory may sometimes overlap with that of a male.

The territories, which tend to be long and narrow, stretch along river banks, or around the edges of lakes or marshes. Territory sizes vary, but they can be several miles long. Female territories are smaller than those of males.

Each territory has one or two central areas (core areas) where the mink spends most of its time. The core area is usually associated with a good food supply, such as a pool rich in fish, or a good rabbit warren. The mink may stay in its core area, which can be quite small, for several days at a time, but it also makes excursions to the ends of its territory. These excursions seem to be associated with the defense of the territory against intruders. The mink likely checks for any signs of a strange mink and leaves droppings (scat) redolent of its personal scent to reinforce its territorial rights.

Human uses

Farming
The American mink's fur has been highly prized for use in clothing, with hunting giving way to farming. Their treatment on fur farms has been a focus of animal rights and animal welfare activism. American mink have established populations in Europe (including Great Britain) and South America, after being released from mink farms by animal rights activists, or otherwise escaping from captivity. In the UK, under the Wildlife & Countryside Act 1981, it is illegal to release mink into the wild. In some countries, any live mink caught in traps must be humanely killed.

In February 2022, the U.S. house passed a ban on commercial mink farming following the global SARS-CoV-2 outbreak on mink farms. The ban was enacted in an effort to protect public health in light of the COVID-19 pandemic. Mink farms pose the risk of producing SARS-CoV-2 variants that could be transmitted to humans. The cramped living conditions along with the high volume of immunosuppressed mink inhabiting the farms creates a highly hospitable environment for the SARS-CoV-2 virus.There have been approximately 6.1 million mink infected with the SARS-CoV-2 virus, with three variants traced back to farms in the U.S, France, and Denmark.

Ireland 
There are three mink farms in Ireland, in Donegal, Kerry, and Laois. Mink farming was introduced into the country by two veterinarians. Three thousand mink were released by campaigners into the wild from a farm in the 1960s. It is estimated that there are 33,500 wild mink in Ireland.

The Irish Department of Agriculture stated in November 2020 saying that the Department of Health had advised, following the detection of coronavirus among animals on a Danish mink farm, that the roughly 120,000 farmed Irish mink should be culled. Mink farming was already due to be discontinued under the 2020 Programme for Government but the coronavirus risk had expedited the closure of the industry.

Denmark

Health concerns

Minks are among the animals that can be infected with SARS-CoV-2 and that are also known to spread these infections among themselves and to humans. Transmission of the SARS-CoV-2 virus from minks to humans was first documented in the Netherlands by way of genetic tracing, which prompted the government to bring forward to the end of 2020 a ban on mink farming scheduled to go into effect in 2024. The United States Department of Agriculture confirmed that cases of minks infected with COVID-19 had been documented in Utah in August 2020.

In November 2020, Denmark, then the world's largest producer of mink fur, slaughtered its entire mink population of 15 to 17 million animals to stop the spread of Cluster 5, a mutated strain of the virus, which has been linked to the animals and resulted in the infection of 12 humans with the mutated variant. The decision was later deemed to have been illegal, although the law was later changed in support of the action. Infections within mink were also deemed ancestral to a highly mutated SARS-CoV-2 strain found in Canadian white-tailed deer which subsequently spilled back into humans.

Similar to their role of a viral incubator in the COVID-19 pandemic, in October 2022, mink at a farm in Spain became the first observed case of mammal-to-mammal transmission of Influenza A virus subtype H5N1, an avian flu which had only previously jumped to mammals upon close contact or consumption or infected birds. The infected mink in Spain exhibited multiple new mutations when compared to viral sequences obtained from infected birds, one of which helps H5N1 to better replicate within mammals.

Stereotypy 
On farms, minks are placed in battery cages, a type of soft, metal wire cage that restricts their ability to move. This often results in a condition referred to as stereotypies, an abnormal behavior. These abnormal, repetitive behaviours are a result of keeping them imprisoned, and is similar to the deterioration of mental health in humans. Stereotypies have also been noted to increase during human presence.

To attempt to eliminate stereotypies in captive mink, the Canadian National Farm Animal Care Council has implemented regulations on incorporating environmental enrichments into mink cages. Enrichments are pen-related alterations or the addition of novel objects to improve the mink's physical and psychological health. Enrichments may help reduce the onset of stereotypies, but rarely decrease or eliminate them entirely. Leaving minks alone plays a large role in the prevention of stereotypies, and the animals' well-being.

References

External links

 
 

Mammal common names
Semiaquatic mammals
Mustelinae